Sir George Sayers Bain  (born 24 February 1939) is a British-Canadian academic. He was President and Vice-Chancellor of Queen's University, Belfast, Northern Ireland from 1998 to 2004.

Early life
Bain was born and brought up in Winnipeg, Manitoba, Canada. He was educated at Miles Macdonell Collegiate. He studied economics and political science at the University of Manitoba. He then proceeded to Nuffield College, Oxford, where he took a Doctor of Philosophy degree in industrial relations.

He served as President of the Manitoba New Democratic Party from 1962 to 1963.

Academic career
Bain began his academic career at Nuffield College; the University of Manchester Institute of Science and Technology; the University of Warwick, where he was Chairman of the School of Industrial and Business Studies between 1983 and 1989; and finally the London Business School, where he was Principal between 1989 and 1997.

He was a member of the Committee of Inquiry into Industrial Democracy chaired by Lord Bullock in 1976–1977, of the Senior Salaries Review Body during 1993-6, and was Chairman of the Low Pay Commission during 1997–2002, the Work and Parents Taskforce in 2001, and the Independent Review of the Fire Service in 2002.

He is a non-executive director of Bombardier Aerospace, Canada Life Group (UK) Ltd, the Canada Life Capital Corporation, Electra Investment Trust Plc, and Iain More Associates Ltd.

He holds eleven honorary doctorates and was knighted in 2001.

Career at Queen's

Bain's gregarious and extrovert personality was in marked contrast to the sombre leadership offered by his predecessor Sir Gordon Beveridge. The latter's tenure was marked by an acrimonious dispute within, and without the University over symbols and the use of the national anthem at graduations ceremonies. Bain pushed Queen's further up the research league table, the RAE but as this was achieved in part by the axing of long-standing departments like Geology, Classics and Irish Studies he suffered from a letter-writing campaign in the Belfast press from supporters of the staff whose posts were closed.

Perhaps the most public disappointment of his time at the helm of the university was the failure of the £60 million "Lanyon II" campaign to create a new 'student village'. The self-styled pressure-group "QUB Watch" also kept him under relentless scrutiny over the closure of the Armagh campus, and over what it considered his failure to reduce the number of cases of religious discrimination being taken against the university by members of staff.

His tenure at Queen's was also notable for a successful fundraising campaign for the Seamus Heaney Poetry Centre and for a new Library building.

Independent Review of the Fire Service
Bain was asked to chair a government-funded Independent Review of the Fire Service in 2002, it was wide-ranging and placed fire and rescue services in the UK under close scrutiny – it led to strike action by firefighters, shortly before the report's publication, although the FBU and fire and rescue services had been in tense negotiations for a year before.  Sir Anthony Young and Sir Michael Lyons co-authored the review. The Bain Review was presented to the Deputy Prime Minister on 16 December 2002, but a position paper was delivered earlier. Bain said "Taking into account the very generous pension entitlement, the holiday arrangements, the good job security, firemen are actually not badly rewarded. The recruitment and retention figures back this up. There's about 40 applications for every vacancy in the fire service."

See also
 Fire services in the United Kingdom

References

External links
Catalogue of Bain's papers, held at the Modern Records Centre, University of Warwick

1939 births
Living people
Academics of Queen's University Belfast
Academics of the University of Warwick
Academics of the University of Manchester Institute of Science and Technology
Academics of London Business School
Academic staff of the University of Manitoba
Knights Bachelor
People from Winnipeg
University of Manitoba alumni
Alumni of Nuffield College, Oxford
Fellows of Nuffield College, Oxford
Vice-Chancellors of Queen's University Belfast
Canadian Knights Bachelor
Canadian emigrants to the United Kingdom